No. 7 Helicopter Squadron is a squadron of the Sri Lanka Air Force. It currently operates Bell 212s, Bell 206s from SLAF Hingurakgoda for troop transport, MEDEVAC and training helicopter pilots.

History
In 1994, No. 4 Helicopter Wing was split into two Squadrons namely 401 and 402. No. 401 Squadron took charge of operational flying requirements and pilot training, and was located at SLAF Hingurakgoda with Bell 212 and Bell Jet Ranger helicopters in its fleet. It was later renamed as the No. 7 Squadron in July 1996 when Squadron Leader KVB Jayampathy was commanding. No. 402 Squadron remained at SLAF Katunayake and flew Bell 412 and Bell Jet Rangers, largely catering to VIP movement. In 1995 Mil Mi-24 were temporarily attached to this squadron before forming their own No. 9 Attack Helicopter Squadron. Flying Officer Asela Wickramasinghe was the youngest to command a helicopter at the age of 22.Pilot Officer Ravi Dharmawickrama was the first volunteer pilot ever to command a helicopter in battle field. Further he achieved a VIP rating when ranked flying officer a year after in the same squadron. Then Squadron Leader Avindra Mirando earned his second WWV (Weera Wickrama Vibhushanaya) medal and became the first to be earned bar (Two time award of the same medal) for WWV flying for the squadron. Posthumous Squadron Leader Dushantha Edirisinghe and his co-pilot Flight Lieutenant Upul Thennakoon were the first fatalities of the squadron. Both were killed when their Bell 212 CH-561 helicopter was shot down off Olumadu.

Aircraft operated
Bell 212
Bell 206

Notable members
 Air Vice Marshal (Squadron Leader) Kapila Jayampathy WWV, RWP, RSP, (03bars),MSc (IR), MIM (SL), qhi, fndu (China) First Commanding Officer
 Air Vice Marshal (Flight Lieutenant) Kapila Wanigasooriya USP RWP, RSP, MDS, fndu (China), psc
 Air Commodore (Squadron Leader) Royce Gunaratne WWV, RWP, RSP, Msc, NDC, PSc, QHI – Second Commanding Officer
 Wing Commander (Squadron Leader) Avindra Mirando WWV (bar), RSP (03 Bars) – Third Commanding Officer
 Wg Cdr Wasantha Jayawardhane RSP, psc, qhi Commanding Officer
 Sqn Ldr Senarath Weerasekara BSc (Def Stu) Officer Commanding Maintenance
 Sqn Ldr Dhammika Dias WWV, RSP, qhi Officer Commanding Operations
 Sqn Ldr Duleep Hewawitharana BSc (Def Stu), qhi Officer Commanding Training
 Sqn Ldr SL wijesena Officer Commanding Maintenance
 Sqn Ldr SS Liyanagunawardana BSc in Aero Eng – Deputy OCM
 Sqn Ldr Vinodh Jayasinghe RSP, qhi Officer Commanding Training

References

 rise of No 6 Helicopter Squadron of SLAF

External links
Sri Lanka Air Force  Base Katunayake 
Sri Lanka Air Force official website 
www.scramble.nl

Military units and formations established in 1994
7